The Parliament of the Republic of Moldova elected on 6 March 2005 had 101 seats.

Parliamentary positions
Speaker of the Parliament - Marian Lupu
Deputy Speaker of the Parliament
Standing Bureau
The working body of the Parliament - the Standing Bureau - is formed taking into consideration the proportional representation of the factions in the Legislative body. The Chairman and Deputy Chairmen are its ex officio members. The number of members of the Standing Bureau is determined by the Parliament's decision.
 Marian Lupu - Speaker of the Parliament, representing the Party of Communists of the Republic of Moldova (PCRM)
 Maria Postoico - Deputy Speaker of the Parliament, representing the Party of Communists of the Republic of Moldova (PCRM)
 Iurie Roşca - Deputy Speaker of the Parliament, representing the Christian-Democratic People's Party
 Dumitru Braghiş - representing the Party Alliance Our Moldova
 Ivan Călin - representing the Party of Communists of the Republic of Moldova (PCRM)
 Dumitru Diacov - representing the Democratic Party of Moldova
 Vladimir Eremciuc - representing the Party of Communists of the Republic of Moldova (PCRM)
 Eugenia Ostapciuc - representing the Party of Communists of the Republic of Moldova (PCRM)
 Oleg Serebrian - representing the Social Liberal Party
 Victor Stepaniuc - representing the Party of Communists of the Republic of Moldova (PCRM)
 Serafim Urechean - representing the Party Alliance Our Moldova

Members

2005 in Moldova
2006 in Moldova
2007 in Moldova
2008 in Moldova
2009 in Moldova
Government of Moldova
2005-2009